When Harry Met Sally... is a 1989 American romantic  comedy-drama film written by Nora Ephron and directed by Rob Reiner. It stars Billy Crystal as Harry and Meg Ryan as Sally. The story follows the title characters from the time they meet in Chicago just before sharing a cross-country drive, through twelve years of chance encounters in New York City. The film addresses but does not resolve questions along the lines of "Can men and women ever just be friends?"

Ideas for the film began when Rob Reiner divorced from Penny Marshall. An interview Ephron conducted with Reiner provided the basis for Harry. Sally was based on Ephron and some of her friends. Crystal came on board and made his own contributions to the screenplay, making Harry funnier.  Ephron supplied the structure of the film with much of the dialogue based on the real-life friendship between Reiner and Crystal. The soundtrack consists of standards from Harry Connick Jr., with a big band and orchestra arranged by Marc Shaiman. For his work on the soundtrack, Connick won his first Grammy Award for Best Jazz Male Vocal Performance.

Columbia Pictures released When Harry Met Sally... in selected cities, letting word of mouth generate interest, before gradually expanding distribution. The film grossed $92.8 million in North America, and was released to critical acclaim. Ephron received a British Academy Film Award, an Oscar nomination, and a Writers Guild of America Award nomination for her screenplay. The film is ranked 23rd on AFI's 100 Years... 100 Laughs list of the top comedy films in American cinema and number 60 on Bravo's "100 Funniest Movies". In early 2004, the film was adapted for the stage in a production starring Luke Perry and Alyson Hannigan.

In 2022, the film was selected for preservation in the United States National Film Registry by the Library of Congress as being "culturally, historically, or aesthetically significant".

Plot
In 1977, Harry Burns and Sally Albright graduate from the University of Chicago. Harry is dating Sally's friend Amanda Reese, leading to Harry and Sally ride-sharing to New York City. Sally is attending journalism school there and Harry has a job waiting.

During the drive, Harry and Sally discuss their differing ideas about relationships; Sally disagrees with Harry's assertion that men and women cannot be friends as, "the sex part gets in the way". They stop at a diner, and when Harry tells Sally she is very attractive, she angrily accuses him of making a pass. They part company in New York, never intending to see each other again.

Five years later in 1982, Harry and Sally find themselves on the same flight. Sally is dating Harry's neighbor Joe, and Harry is engaged to Helen, which surprises Sally, as it seems uncharacteristically optimistic of him. Harry suggests they become friends, forcing him to qualify his previous position about the impossibility of male-female friendships. They separate, concluding that they will not be friends.

Five years later in 1987, Harry and Sally run into each other at a bookstore. They have coffee and talk about their previous relationships; Sally and Joe broke up and Helen left Harry for another man. They agree to pursue a friendship and have late-night phone conversations, go to dinner, and spend time together discussing their love-lives.

During a New Year's Eve party, Harry and Sally find themselves growing attracted to each other and share an awkward midnight kiss. They remain friends and set each other up with their respective best friends, Marie and Jess. When the four go out, neither Marie or Jess are attracted to Harry or Sally and instead immediately fall for each other. Soon after, the two are engaged.

One night, Sally tearfully calls Harry to say that her ex, Joe, is getting married. Harry goes to Sally's apartment to comfort her but they end up having sex. Harry leaves the next morning, feeling awkward and filled with regret. Their friendship cools until they have a heated argument at Jess and Marie's wedding reception. Harry attempts to mend their relationship, but Sally feels that they can no longer be friends.

At a 1988 New Year's Eve party with Jess and Marie, Sally misses Harry. He is spending New Year's Eve at home, watching Dick Clark's 16th annual New Year's Rockin' Eve. Before midnight, Harry walks around the city. As Sally is about to leave the party, Harry appears and declares his love for her. She claims he is only there because he is lonely, but he lists the many reasons he loves her. Harry and Sally marry three months later, exactly 12 years and three months after their first meeting.

The film contains several interspersed segments of older couples discussing how they met. The true stories, gathered by Nora Ephron, are reenacted by actors. The final couple interviewed, before the closing credits, is Harry and Sally.

Cast
 Billy Crystal as Harry Burns
 Meg Ryan as Sally Albright
 Carrie Fisher as Marie 
 Bruno Kirby as Jess 
 Steven Ford as Joe
 Lisa Jane Persky as Alice
 Michelle Nicastro as Amanda Reese
 Kevin Rooney as Ira Stone
 Harley Kozak as Helen Hillson
 Estelle Reiner as Female Customer

Production
In 1984, director Rob Reiner, producer Andy Scheinman and writer Nora Ephron met over lunch at the Russian Tea Room in New York City to develop a project. Reiner pitched an idea for a film that Ephron rejected. The second meeting transformed into a long discussion about Reiner and Scheinman's lives as single men. Reiner remembers, "I was in the middle of my single life. I'd been divorced for a while. I'd been out a number of times, all these disastrous, confusing relationships one after another." The next time they all met, Reiner said that he had always wanted to do a film about two people who become friends and do not have sex because they know it will ruin their relationship but have sex anyway. Ephron liked the idea, and Reiner acquired a deal at a studio.

For materials, Ephron interviewed Reiner and Scheinman about their lives, creating the basis for Harry. Reiner was constantly depressed and pessimistic yet funny. Ephron also got bits of dialogue from these interviews. Sally was based on Ephron and some of her friends. She worked on several drafts over the years while Reiner made Stand By Me and The Princess Bride. Billy Crystal "experienced vicariously" Reiner's (his best friend at the time) return to single life after divorcing comedian/filmmaker Penny Marshall and in the process was unconsciously doing research for the role of Harry. Tom Hanks, Richard Dreyfuss, Michael Keaton and Albert Brooks were all offered the role of Harry Burns but all of them turned it down, with Brooks feeling the movie was too reminiscent of Woody Allen's work.

During the screenwriting process when Ephron did not feel like writing, she would interview people who worked for the production company. Some of the interviews appeared in the film as the interludes between certain scenes featuring couples talking about how they met, although the material was rewritten and reshot with actors. Ephron supplied the structure of the film with much of the dialogue based on the real-life friendship between Reiner and Crystal. For example, in the scene where Sally and Harry appear on a split-screen, talking on the telephone while watching their respective television sets, channel surfing, was something that Crystal and Reiner did every night.

Originally, Ephron wanted to call the film How They Met and went through several different titles. Reiner even started a contest with the crew during principal photography: whoever came up with the title won a case of champagne. In order to get into the lonely mindset of Harry when he was divorced and single, Crystal stayed by himself in a separate room from the cast and crew while they were shooting in Manhattan. The script initially ended with Harry and Sally remaining friends and not pursuing a romantic relationship because she felt that was "the true ending", as did Reiner. Eventually, Ephron and Reiner realized that it would be a more appropriate ending for them to marry, though they admit that this was generally not a realistic outcome.

When posed the film's central question, can men and women just be friends, Ryan replied, "Yes, men and women can just be friends. I have a lot of platonic (male) friends, and sex doesn't get in the way." Crystal said, "I'm a little more optimistic than Harry. But I think it is difficult. Men basically act like stray dogs in front of a supermarket. I do have platonic (women) friends, but not best, best, best friends."

Reiner's mother Estelle and daughter Tracy both played roles in the film.

Katz's Delicatessen scene

In a scene featuring the two title characters having lunch at Katz's Delicatessen in Manhattan, the couple are arguing about a man's ability to recognize when a woman is faking an orgasm. Sally claims that men cannot tell the difference, and to prove her point, she vividly (fully clothed) fakes one as other diners watch. The scene ends with Sally casually returning to her meal as a nearby patron (played by Reiner's mother) places her order, deadpan: "I'll have what she's having." When Estelle Reiner died at age 94 in 2008, The New York Times referred to her as the woman "who delivered one of the most memorably funny lines in movie history". This scene was shot again and again, and Ryan demonstrated her fake orgasms for hours. Katz's Deli still hangs a sign above the table that says, "Where Harry met Sally... hope you have what she had!"

The memorable scene was born when the film started to focus too much on Harry. Crystal remembers saying, We need something for Sally to talk about,' and Nora said, 'Well, faking orgasm is a great one,' and right away we said, 'Well, the subject is good,' and then Meg came on board and we talked with her about the nature of the idea and she said, 'Well, why don't I just fake one, just do one? Ryan suggested that the scene take place in a restaurant, and it was Crystal who came up with the scene's classic punchline – "I'll have what she's having." In 2005, the quote was listed 33rd on the AFI's 100 Years... 100 Movie Quotes list of memorable movie lines. Reiner recalls that at a test screening, all of the women in the audience were laughing while all of the men were silent.

In late 2013, Improv Everywhere, the New York City initiative behind the annual No Pants Day in the subways and various flash-mob stunts, convened and filmed a re-enactment in Katz's Delicatessen. While a look-alike couple performed the scene, 30 others joined as if it was contagious. Surprised staff and customers responded in appreciation. The film and follow-up interviews are public. In October of the same year, Katz's invited Baron Von Fancy to display his ten-foot-high mural quoting the famous line in its pop-up gallery next door, The Space.

Soundtrack

The When Harry Met Sally... soundtrack album features American singer and pianist Harry Connick Jr. Bobby Colomby, the drummer for Blood, Sweat & Tears, was a friend of Reiner's and recommended Harry Connick Jr., giving the director a tape of the musician's music. Reiner was struck by Connick's voice and how he sounded like a young Frank Sinatra. The movie's soundtrack album was released by Columbia Records in July 1989. The soundtrack consists of standards performed by Harry Connick Jr. with a big band and orchestra arranged by Marc Shaiman. Connick won his first Grammy for Best Jazz Male Vocal Performance.

Arrangements and orchestrations on "It Had to Be You", "Where or When", "I Could Write a Book", and "But Not for Me" are by Connick and Shaiman. Other songs were performed as piano/vocal solos, or with Connick's trio featuring Benjamin Jonah Wolfe on bass and Jeff "Tain" Watts on drums. Also appearing on the album are tenor saxophonist Frank Wess and guitarist Jay Berliner. The soundtrack went to #1 on the Billboard Traditional Jazz Chart and was within the top 50 on the Billboard 200. Connick also toured North America in support of this album. It went on to reach double-platinum status.

The soundtrack features performances by Louis Armstrong and Ella Fitzgerald, Frank Sinatra, Ray Charles, Bing Crosby, and Harry Connick Jr.

Reception

Box office
Columbia Pictures released When Harry Met Sally... using the "platform" technique which involved opening it in a few select cities letting positive word of mouth generate interest and then gradually expanding distribution over subsequent weeks. On its opening weekend, it grossed $1,094,453 in 41 theaters, the second highest-grossing opening weekend for a film on fewer than 50 screens, behind Star Wars (1977). Billy Crystal was worried that the film would flop at the box office because it was up against several summer blockbuster films, like Indiana Jones and the Last Crusade and Batman. The film opened in early July and went into wide release on July 21, 1989, grossing $8.8 million in 775 theaters in its first weekend of national release. The film later expanded to 1,174 theaters, and ultimately grossed $92.8 million in North America, well above its $16 million budget.

Critical response
On the review aggregator Rotten Tomatoes, When Harry Met Sally... holds an approval rating of 91% based on 79 reviews, with an average rating of 8.00/10. The website's critics consensus reads, "Rob Reiner's touching, funny film set a new standard for romantic comedies, and he was ably abetted by the sharp interplay between Billy Crystal and Meg Ryan." On Metacritic, the film has a weighted average score of 76 out of 100, based on 17 critics, indicating "generally favorable reviews". Audiences polled by CinemaScore gave the film a rare "A+" grade.

The film led Roger Ebert to call Reiner "one of Hollywood's very best directors of comedy", and said the film was "most conventional, in terms of structure and the way it fulfills our expectations. But what makes it special, apart from the Ephron screenplay, is the chemistry between Crystal and Ryan."

In a review for The New York Times, Caryn James called When Harry Met Sally... an "often funny but amazingly hollow film" that "romanticized lives of intelligent, successful, neurotic New Yorkers"; James characterized it as "the sitcom version of a Woody Allen film, full of amusing lines and scenes, all infused with an uncomfortable sense of déjà vu".

Rita Kempley of The Washington Post praised Meg Ryan as the "summer's Melanie Griffith – a honey-haired blonde who finally finds a showcase for her sheer exuberance. Neither naif nor vamp, she's a woman from a pen of a woman, not some Cinderella of a Working Girl." Mike Clark of USA Today gave the film three out of four stars, writing, "Crystal is funny enough to keep Ryan from all-out stealing the film. She, though, is smashing in an eye-opening performance, another tribute to Reiner's flair with actors." David Ansen provided one of the rare negative reviews of the film for Newsweek. He criticized the casting of Crystal, "Not surprisingly he handles the comedy superbly, but he's too cool and self-protective an actor to work as a romantic leading man", and felt that as a film, "of wonderful parts, it doesn't quite add up".

Accolades

The film is recognized by American Film Institute in these lists:
 2000: AFI's 100 Years...100 Laughs – #23
 2002: AFI's 100 Years...100 Passions – #25
 2004: AFI's 100 Years...100 Songs:
 "It Had to Be You" – #60
 2005: AFI's 100 Years...100 Movie Quotes:
 Customer: "I'll have what she's having." – #33
 2008: AFI's 10 Top 10:
 #6 Romantic Comedy Film

Home media
When Harry Met Sally... was  first released on VHS in late 1989, a few months after its theatrical release. It was later re-released on VHS in 1994 as part of a Billy Crystal collection, and in 1997 under the Contemporary Classics edition; the latter release included trailers that were not included in the original VHS release. It was released on DVD for the first time on January 9, 2001, and included an audio commentary by Reiner, a 35-minute "Making Of" documentary featuring interviews with Reiner, Ephron, Crystal, and Ryan, seven deleted scenes, and a music video for "It Had To Be You" by Harry Connick Jr. A Collector's Edition DVD was released on January 15, 2008, including a new audio commentary with Reiner, Ephron, and Crystal, eight deleted scenes, all new featurettes (It All Started Like This, Stories Of Love, When Rob Met Billy, Billy On Harry, I Love New York, What Harry Meeting Sally Meant, So Can Men And Women Really Be Friends?), and the original theatrical trailer. The film was released on Blu-ray on July 5, 2011 containing all of the special features found on the 2008 DVD release.

Legacy
Over the years, When Harry Met Sally... has become "the quintessential contemporary feel-good relationship movie that somehow still rings true". Before she died, Ephron still received letters from people obsessed with the film and still had "people who say to me all the time, 'I was having a Harry-and-Sally relationship with him or her'." The film is 23rd on AFI's 100 Years... 100 Laughs list of the top comedy films in American cinema and number 60 on Bravo's "100 Funniest Movies." Entertainment Weekly named it as one of the Top 10 romantic movies of all time. The magazine also ranked it 12th on their Funniest Movies of the Past 25 Years list. The periodical also ranked it 7th on their 25 Best Romantic Movies of the Past 25 Years list and #3 on their Top 25 Modern Romances list. The film has inspired countless romantic comedies, including A Lot Like Love, Hum Tum, and Definitely, Maybe. In addition, the film helped popularize many ideas about love that have become household concepts now, such as the "high-maintenance" girlfriend and the "transitional person". ‘’You can find traces of ‘When Harry Met Sally’ DNA in virtually every romantic comedy that’s been made since,” The A.V. Club noted.

In June 2008, AFI revealed its "Ten top Ten"—the best ten films in ten "classic" American film genres—after polling over 1,500 people from the creative community. When Harry Met Sally was acknowledged as the sixth best film in the romantic comedy genre. It is also ranked #15 on Rotten Tomatoes' 25 Best Romantic Comedies.

In early 2004, the film was adapted for the stage in a Theatre Royal Haymarket production starring Luke Perry and Alyson Hannigan. Molly Ringwald and Michael Landes later replaced Hannigan and Perry for the second cast.

In 2022, the film was selected for preservation in the United States National Film Registry by the Library of Congress as being "culturally, historically, or aesthetically significant".

References

External links

 
 
 
 
 
 

1989 films
1989 romantic comedy films
American romantic comedy films
Castle Rock Entertainment films
Columbia Pictures films
1980s English-language films
Films about couples
Films directed by Rob Reiner
Films scored by Marc Shaiman
Films set in 1977
Films set in 1982
Films set in 1987
Films set in 1988
Films set in 1989
Films set in Chicago
Films set in New York City
Films shot in Chicago
Films shot in New York City
Films whose writer won the Best Original Screenplay BAFTA Award
Films with screenplays by Nora Ephron
Films set around New Year
1980s American films
United States National Film Registry films